The Intervision Song Contest (ISC) was an international song contest for artists from Eastern Bloc countries. It was the communist equivalent to the Eurovision Song Contest. Its organiser was Intervision, the network of Eastern Bloc television stations. The contest would usually take place in the Forest Opera in Sopot, Poland.

The ISC was organised between 1977 and 1980. It replaced the Sopot International Song Festival (Sopot ISF) that had been held in Sopot since 1961. In 1981 the ISC/Sopot ISF was cancelled because of the rise of the independent trade union movement, Solidarity, which was judged by other Eastern bloc communist governments to be "counter-revolutionary". A revived contest took place in 2008, though subsequent editions planned to stage the contest again in both 2014 and 2015 did not materialize.

History

The first Sopot International Song Festival was initiated and organised in 1961 by Władysław Szpilman, assisted by Szymon Zakrzewski from Polish Artists Management (PAGART). The first three editions were held in the Gdańsk Shipyard hall (1961–1963), after which the festival moved to the Forest Opera (Opera Lesna). The main prize has been Amber Nightingale through most of its history.

Between 1977 and 1980 it was replaced by the Intervision Song Contest, which was still held in Sopot. Unlike the Eurovision Song Contest, the Sopot International Music Festival often changed its formulas to pick a winner and offered many different contests for its participants. For example, at the 4th Intervision Song Festival (held in Sopot 20–23 August 1980) two competitions were organized: one for artists representing television companies, the other for those representing record companies. In the first competition, the jury considered the artistic merits of the songs entered, while in the second, it judged the performers' interpretation. The festival has always been open to non-European acts, and countries like Cuba, Dominican Republic, Mongolia, New Zealand, Nigeria, Peru, South Africa and many others have been represented in this event.

The contest lost popularity in Poland and abroad in the 1980s. The rather unconvincing organizations by TVP made the authorities of Sopot give the organization of the 2005 Sopot International Song Festival to a private TV channel, TVN. Since 1999, there has been no contest. TVP chose to invite well-known artists instead, featuring the likes of Whitney Houston or The Corrs. In 2005, TVN was expected to bring the competition back. In 2006 TVN invited Elton John. The Sopot International Song Festival is usually considered bigger than the Benidorm International Song Festival because of its ability to attract star performers. In 2010 and 2011, the festival did not take place due to renovation of the Forest Opera. Since 2012, it has been called Sopot Top of the Top Festival and is broadcast annually by Polsat. The festival also provided opportunity to listen to international stars. It featured Charles Aznavour, Boney M, Johnny Cash, and more recently: Chuck Berry, Vanessa Mae, Annie Lennox, Vaya Con Dios, Chris Rea, Tanita Tikaram, La Toya Jackson, Whitney Houston, Kajagoogoo, and Goran Bregovic, Anastacia.

Revival
Eleven countries participated in the fifth edition in 2008, which was won by Tajikistan. In 2009, the then prime minister Vladimir Putin of Russia proposed restarting the competition, this time between Russia, China and the Central Asian member states of the Shanghai Cooperation Organisation. In May 2014, it was announced that the contest would return, featuring countries from the Commonwealth of Independent States and the Shanghai Cooperation Organisation. Russian singer and producer Igor Matvienko, announced that the revival of the Intervision Song Contest would take place in October 2014 in the coastal city of Sochi, which played host to the 2014 Winter Olympics. Seven countries had declared their interest to compete prior to the event's cancellation: Kazakhstan, Kyrgyzstan, Russia, Tajikistan, Turkmenistan, China and Uzbekistan. Russia had also selected Alexander Ivanov as its representative.

The contest was scheduled to take place in October 2014 ostensibly due to "Russian anger at the moral decay of the West", particularly in response to the Eurovision Song Contest 2014 winner Conchita Wurst. Moreover, the revival was seen as part of "Putin's broader cultural diplomacy agenda". Despite plans to stage the contest in both 2014 and 2015, the revival of the contest has not taken place. Ivanov later represented Belarus in Eurovision 2016 with the song Help You Fly but he failed to qualify.

Participation
The contest is formally open to members of the Shanghai Co-operation Organisation and any countries of the former Soviet Union.

Table key
 Former – Former countries that have been dissolved.

Winners

Winners by country

Winners by language

See also 

 ABU Song Festivals
 Bundesvision Song Contest
 Cân i Gymru
 Caribbean Song Festival
 Eurovision Dance Contest
 Eurovision Song Contest
 Eurovision Young Dancers
 Eurovision Young Musicians
 Junior Eurovision Song Contest
 OGAE
 OGAE Second Chance Contest
 OGAE Video Contest
 OTI Festival
 Pan Celtic Festival
 Sopot International Song Festival
 Turkvision Song Contest

References
 Notes

 References

External links

 BBC Magazine: The Cold War rival to Eurovision, Steve Rosenberg, 13 May 2012

 
Eastern Bloc
Recurring events established in 1977
Recurring events disestablished in 1980
Song contests
Sopot International Song Festival